HumanForest is a dockless bicycle hire service in London in the United Kingdom. Unlike competitors, the service charges £1.50 if you do not park in borough designated areas. As of September 2021, HumanForest has over 800 bicycles on city streets, making it one of the four main e-bike operators in London, competing with Santander Cycles (docked) and Lime/Jump (both owned by Uber), these services replacing Chinese companies Mobike and Ofo after their insolvencies and removal.

HumanForest launched in 2020, but was shut down within months after someone was injured due to a faulty e-bike. The company recalled all of the bikes and replaced them, restarting service in 2021.

The service aims to be different to its competition by promoting green ideals and providing users with 10 minutes of free service a day.

HumanForest is ad supported by partners such as Nutmeg and Whole Foods

References

Community bicycle programs
Cycling in London
2020 in London
Bicycle sharing in the United Kingdom